Dennis Woodruff (born 1952) is a Los Angeles based actor, producer, and director. He is known for his ostentatious self-promotion of his services as an actor, and for his fleet of hand decorated "art cars". Much of his fame has been derived from his lack of success in the movie industry.

Woodruff was born in Huntington Beach, California. He is the grandson of S. H. Woodruff, a prominent developer of Hollywoodland. In the 1980s, he began to decorate cars in order to advertise his acting career, and by the 2000s, he was producing his own movies. In 2020, he stated that he has created 28 movies and 3 television programs alongside collaborator Keith Kurlander. He sells physical copies of his films from the trunk of his car, and claims to make $100,000 doing so annually. He is also known for giving tours on Hollywood Boulevard, and selling his movies to tourists.

References

External links
 

American male film actors
Male actors from Huntington Beach, California
1952 births
Living people